Morai Dam  is an earthfill dam located in Hokkaido Prefecture in Japan. The dam is used for irrigation. The catchment area of the dam is 20.5 km2. The dam impounds about 63  ha of land when full and can store 5600 thousand cubic meters of water. The construction of the dam was started on 1977 and completed in 1996.

References

Dams in Hokkaido